Sysoyevka is a rural locality (a village) in Beketovsky Selsoviet, Yermekeyevsky District, Bashkortostan, Russia. The population was 1 as of 2010. There is 1 street.

Geography 
Sysoyevka is located 28 km southeast of Yermekeyevo (the district's administrative centre) by road. Beketovo is the nearest rural locality.

References 

Rural localities in Yermekeyevsky District